John MacDonell (born April 2, 1956) is a Canadian retired educator and politician.

A native of Halifax, MacDonell was educated at Acadia University and Saint Mary's University. MacDonell worked on a dairy farm and taught biology at Hants East Rural High School from 1985 to 1998.

Political career
In 1998, MacDonell successfully ran for the Nova Scotia New Democratic Party nomination in the riding of Hants East.  He was elected in the 1998 provincial election and was re-elected in the 1999, 2003, 2006 and 2009 provincial elections.

In 2002, MacDonell was a candidate for the leadership of the Nova Scotia NDP. At the leadership convention in June 2002, MacDonell was defeated by Darrell Dexter.

On June 19, 2009, MacDonell was appointed to the Executive Council of Nova Scotia, where he served first as Minister of Natural Resources until 2011. He then served as Minister of Agriculture.  MacDonell was defeated in the 2013 provincial election.

References 

1956 births
Living people
Members of the Executive Council of Nova Scotia
Nova Scotia New Democratic Party MLAs
People from Halifax, Nova Scotia
Acadia University alumni
Canadian schoolteachers
Saint Mary's University (Halifax) alumni
21st-century Canadian politicians